Étienne Daille (born 19 September 1989 in Prague, Czechoslovakia) is a French slalom canoeist who has competed at the international level since 2007.

Daille won the overall World Cup title in the K1 class in 2012 by 75 points after finishing on the podium at every round. He won a bronze medal in the K1 team event at the 2013 ICF Canoe Slalom World Championships in Prague. He also won two medals (1 gold and 1 silver) in the K1 team event at the European Championships. Daille finished as the World No. 1 in the K1 event in 2012 and 2013.

At the 2012 Summer Olympics he competed in the K1 event, finishing 13th in the heats and qualifying for the semifinals. He qualified for the final with the 10th fastest time. In the final he ranked 7th, with a gap of +8.44 behind the winner.

Son of a French father and Czech mother, both athletes, Daille grew up in Pays du Bugey.

World Cup individual podiums

References

External links
 
 

French male canoeists
1989 births
Living people
Olympic canoeists of France
Canoeists at the 2012 Summer Olympics
French people of Czech descent
Czech people of French descent
Medalists at the ICF Canoe Slalom World Championships